Alexander Stanislavovich Dyachenko  (born June 12, 1965) is a Russian actor, record producer and musician.

Biography 
Alexander Dyachenko was born in Leningrad, Russian SFSR, Soviet Union in southern Saint Petersburg, Russia. He studied at Saint Petersburg Electrotechnical University.

He started acting in small roles in films. In 1994, he received an offer to try his hand in sports management. As a child Dyachenko loved hockey, he immediately agreed to work as an agent of the Russian hockey players. In 1998, Alexander left his job and moved to the U.S. where he received an actor's education, training in Los Angeles under the teacher Milton Katselos. He acted on stage in Chicago.

His acting career in Russia began with the film Brother 2. In the film, he played the twin brothers Dmitry and Konstantin Gromov. He was cast in a number of Russian films and serials. From his youth Dyachenko has also been a musician; composing, arranging and  performing on the guitar and singing. He has recorded some of his songs in a Chicago studio with well-known musicians. In 2012, Alexander, together with drummer Boris Lifschits, created a musical project Antigo.

In year 2011, Dyachenko gave his first Bollywood appearance in 7 Khoon Maaf (an Indian Hindi film directed by Vishal Bhardwaj and produced by Ronnie Screwvala). He played the role of Nikolai Vronsky, the fourth husband of Susanna Anna-Marie Johannes (Priyanka Chopra) who was actually as a Russian spy leading a double life. His role and performance was quite appreciated in Hindi Cinema and the movie made good business at box office.

Selected filmography
2000 — Brother 2 as Dmitry Gromov / Konstantin Gromov
2001 — The Lion's Share as Musa Mahmaev
 2002 — The Star as  Galiev
 2003 — Bajazet as Nazar Minayevich Vatnin, esaul
 2004 — Women's Intuition as Alexander
2005 — Women's Intuition 2 as Alexander
 2006 — Wolfhound as Kanaon
2006 — Leshiy as Alexey Nikitin
2006 — Friend or foe as Denis Volkov
2008 — On the Roof of the World as Dmitry
2010 — Inherited Marriage as Urmas
 2011 — 7 Khoon Maaf as Nicolai Vronsky
2012 — Hunting for Gauleiter as Yakov
2013 — Ash as Diego, Spaniard
2014 — Silver Spoon as Vladimir Yakovlevich Sokolovsky
2018 — McMafia as Oleg, Russian embassy employee
2018 — Hunter Killer as Russian president Nikolai Zakarin
2018 — Double Lies as Leo
2019 — Trap for the Queen as Kirill, stepfather of Maria

References

External links
 
 ANTIGO — музыкальный проект Александра Дьяченко совместно с Борисом Лифшицем
Alexander Dyachenko on Kinopoisk

1965 births
Living people
Male actors from Saint Petersburg
Russian male film actors
Russian male stage actors
Russian male television actors
Russian record producers
Russian musicians